Schultz' gate station was a tram stop on the Oslo Tramway located in the Bogstadveien Street. It was preceded by the Majorstuen stop and succeeded by Rosenborg stop on the Briskeby Line. In 2014, the Rosenborg and Schultz' gate stops were merged with the newly established Bogstadveien, located between those stops.

References

Disused Oslo Tramway stations